Hawthorne School District is a school district headquartered in Hawthorne, California, United States.

The district serves much of Hawthorne.

Zoned schools

Zoned middle schools
 Bud Carson Middle School
 Hawthorne Middle School
 Prairie Vista Middle School

Zoned elementary schools
 Zela Davis Elementary School
 Eucalyptus Elementary School
 Jefferson Elementary School
 Kornblum Elementary School
 Ramona Elementary School
 Washington Elementary School
 York Elementary School

Associated high schools
Hawthorne Math and Science Academy is a charter high school in Hawthorne associated with the Hawthorne School District.

References

External links
 

School districts in Los Angeles County, California
Hawthorne, California